Mark Bourque was a Royal Canadian Mounted Police officer killed while working for the United Nations in Cité Soleil, Haiti on Tuesday, December 20, 2005.

RCMP career
Prior to his mission in Haiti, Bourque had been an RCMP officer for approximately 35 years.  He was stationed in the province of Quebec, where he started work in Granby and Saint-Jean-sur-Richelieu before moving on to Montreal. During his career, he was most noted for his work in money laundering. In 1986, he became heavily involved in a case involving the alleged Mafia crime family Cuntrera-Caruana, headed by Alfonso Caruana, from Siculiana, which lasted for several years.  According to CTV News, "At the time, money-laundering laws were non-existent in Canada. However, Bourque's work pushed the Canadian government to put money-laundering provisions into the Criminal Code." . Bourque retired from the RCMP in 2002.

References

External links
"Bourque's murder probably failed kidnap attempt", CTV.ca, December 21, 2005
"UN to probe Bourque's shooting death", CTV.ca, December 22, 2005
"Ottawa demands answers in death of Canadian peacekeeper in Haiti", CBC News, December 21, 2005
"Slain U.N. peacekeeper from Canada honored", Associated Press / The Mercury News, December 21, 2005
"Cop who toppled heroin network slain in Port-au-Prince", by William Marsden, The Gazette, December 21, 2005

1948 births
2005 deaths
Canadian people murdered abroad
Deaths by firearm in Haiti
Male murder victims
People murdered in Haiti
Royal Canadian Mounted Police officers